Colt Linhas Aéreas, operating as COLT Cargo, was an ACMI cargo airline based in São Paulo, Brazil. It was founded in 2013 by COLT Aviation, a  charter company.

Fleet
COLT Cargo had operated the following aircraft:

See also
List of defunct airlines of Brazil

References

External links
COLT's website

Defunct airlines of Brazil
Airlines established in 2013
Airlines disestablished in 2017
2017 disestablishments in Brazil
Brazilian companies established in 2013